Caliphyllidae is a taxonomic family of sacoglossan sea slugs. These are marine opisthobranch gastropod mollusks in the clade Sacoglossa.

This family has no subfamilies.

Genera
There are five genera in the family Caliphyllidae:
 Caliphylla A. Costa, 1867
 Cyerce Bergh, 1871
 Mourgona Marcus & Marcus, 1970
 Polybranchia Pease, 1860
 Sohgenia Hamatani, 1991
Genera brought into synonymy 
 Branchophyllum Pruvot-Fol, 1947 : synonym of  Polybranchia Pease, 1860
 Lobifera Pease, 1866  : synonym of Polybranchia Pease, 1860
 Phyllobranchillus Pruvot-Fol, 1933  : synonym of Polybranchia Pease, 1860
 Phyllobranchus Alder & Hancock, 1864  : synonym of Polybranchia Pease, 1860

References